Toots may refer to:

People 
Toots (nickname)
Adalbert Toots (1910–1948), Estonian wrestler
Aleksander Toots (born 1969), deputy director of the Estonian Internal Security Service
Arved Toots (1930–1992), Estonian agronomist and breeder of Tori horses
Villu Toots (1916–1993), Estonian calligrapher, book designer, educator, palaeograph and author

Arts and entertainment

Fictional characters 
Toots, a character in Bunty, a British comic anthology 
Toots, one of The Bash Street Kids,  a comic strip in the British comic book The Beano
Toots, a title character of Toots and Casper, an American comic strip
Joosep Toots, one of the main characters in Oskar Luts's novels Kevade, Suvis, and Sügis

Other uses in arts and entertainment
Toots (film), a 2006 documentary about restaurateur Toots Shor
Toots and the Maytals, a Jamaican band

Other uses 
13079 Toots, an asteroid named after musician Toots Thielemans
Folkerts SK-2, a racing airplane nicknamed "Toots"

See also

 Toos (disambiguation)
Toot (disambiguation)

Estonian-language surnames